Schauman is a Swedo-Finnish noble family introduced in both the Swedish House of Nobility and the Finnish House of Nobility. Originally known as a family of high-ranking soldiers, since the 1800s its representatives have become known in numerous other fields. The family is from the Baltic countries and moved to Finland at the end of the 1600s. It is considered to be from the nobility of Courland. However, according to an alternative theory the roots of the family could be in Kurpfalz, Germany, in which in 1596 a family with the same name was ennobled.

The Finnish ancestor of the family is lieutenant colonel Henrik Johan Schauman (1649–1730) of the Turku County Cavalry Regiment, who came from the Ogre region in Livonia and moved to Sweden in 1662. He was naturalized in the Swedish nobility in 1686 by Charles XI of Sweden and his family was introduced to the House of Knights in 1697 as a nobleman, number 1287.

Today's living branches are all descendants of his grandson, noble-muse Berndt Otto Schauman  (1738–1805). In connection with the organization of the Finnish House of Nobility, Schaumans were marked there in 1818 as a noble family, number 96. Descendants of the family moved to Argentina in the late 19th century and in the 1920s to France; the family still lives in both countries. Alternative noble families have subsequently re-elected the right to represent the House of Knights. Schaumans are also living today in Paraguay and the United States.

The Schauman noble family is strongly international, as some of its branches have long existed even in South America.

Notable members of the family 

August Schauman (1826–1876), publicist, founder of the newspaper Hufvudstadsbladet.
 Eugen Schauman (1875–1904), activist, assassin of Governor-General of Finland Nikolay Bobrikov.
 Frans Ludvig Schauman, professor, bishop.
 Georg Schauman (1870–1930), politician, member of parliament.
 Göran Schauman (born 1940), Olympic sailor.
 Harry Schauman (1879–1932), industrialist, founder of Harry Schauman Foundation.
 Ossian Schauman (1862–1922), Professor of Internal Medicine, founder of the non-governmental healthcare organization Folkhälsan.
 Runar Schauman, (1908–1977), actor, theater director.
 Sigrid Schauman (1877–1979), artist, art critic.
 Viktor Schauman (1822–1872), businessman.
 Waldemar Schauman, (1844–1911), lieutenant general, privy counsellor, senator, governor.
 Wilhelm Schauman (1857–1911), industrialist, businessman. 
 Oscar Teodor Schauman (1849–1931), major general, commander of Finnish Dragoon Regiment.
Törbjorn Schauman (1918–2007), businessman.
 Viktor Rafael Schauman (1860–1946), major general, 1st commander of the Finnish Military Academy.

See also 
 Finnish nobility
 Swedish-speaking Finns
 Swedish Knights Room

References

Finnish noble families
Finnish people of Latvian descent